Liberation = Termination is the third album by Finnish melodic death metal band Mors Principium Est.

Characteristics

It was released on March 27, 2007 in the United States.

Track listing

Credits

Musicians
 Jori Haukio – guitars, programming
 Ville Viljanen – vocals
 Jarkko Kokko – guitars
 Marko Tommila – drums
 Teemu Heinola – bass
 Joona Kukkola – keyboards

References

2007 albums
Mors Principium Est albums